Nir Oz (lit. Meadow of Strength) is a kibbutz in southern Israel. It is located in the northwestern Negev desert between Magen and Nirim,  and covers 20,000 dunams. Nir Oz is under the jurisdiction of Eshkol Regional Council.

History
Founded on 1 October 1955, as a Nahal settlement, it was recognized as a kibbutz two months later.

Due to its proximity to Gaza, Nir Oz farmers often come under Palestinian sniper fire. In 2008, the Israel Defense Forces asked the kibbutz to harvest its potatoes at night to lower the risk of attack. On 5 June 2008, a mortar bomb fired from the Gaza Strip hit the Nirlat paint factory on the kibbutz, killing an employee and wounding four others. Hamas claimed responsibility for the attack.

Economy
In addition to agriculture, Nir Oz has a factory for silicon sealant products and an engineering firm. In recent years, Nir Oz has become a major grower of asparagus for export.

Water conservation
Some 750 drought-resistant plants have been tested. The garden, designed by landscape architect Hayyim Kahanovich, uses only 50% of the water used in the center and north of the country. The project is conducted in cooperation with Ben Gurion University of the Negev and serves as a study and observation site for researchers, gardeners, teachers and students from all over the country.

References

External links
Nir Oz Negev Information Center

Kibbutzim
Kibbutz Movement
Nahal settlements
Populated places established in 1955
Water conservation
Gaza envelope
Populated places in Southern District (Israel)
1955 establishments in Israel